Khawaja Syed Shahudin Gillani (1867–1948) ( خواجہ سید شاہ الدین گیلانی) was a Sufi poet of Punjabi. He was a follower of the Sufi Order Sarwari Qadiri and was a disciple of Syed Asghar Ali Shah of Artala Sharif, Sialkot.

Family
Khawaja Syed Shahudin Gillani was born to Syed Qutab-ud-din Gillani at Rang Pura, Sialkot, Pakistan, in 1867. He was the youngest of five. He had one brother, Syed Saeed-Ud-Din, and three sisters
Syed Shahudin had three sons, Syed Abdul Rasheed Gillani, and Syed Mumtaz Ali shah Gillani.

Syed Saeed-ud-din (brother of Shahuddin) is the brother of Khawaja Syed Shahu Din Gillani and has four sons, Syed Khursheed Alam Shah Gillani (buried in Darbar Alia Hazrat Shah Khaki Wali Sarkar Rangpura Sialkot), Syed Muhammad Alam shah Gillani, Syed Abdul Aziz shah Gillani, and Syed Muhammad Sharif shah Gillani.

Appearance and dress
Shahudin stood five feet, eight inches tall, with a thick beard. He usually wore a turban, a tah band (an open cloth used to cover the body below the navel), camise, and a white cloth on his shoulder.

Education
He started his education with learning of the Quran at the age of three and half-year. After learning Quran, he started formal education at home with his father and got expertise in Arabic and Persian language. After that he learned Fiqh, Hadith, Tafsir and logic at the age of thirteen. He was admiring of his teacher "Munshi Rukane AAlam" and commented about him " He was the scholar who practiced the knowledge".

Bay'at or Pledging Spiritual Allegiance

After marriage he settled in Gujrat and opened a grocery store. After closing hours he used to spend his time with religious scholars and other scholarly persons. In a year or two his father died and inherited mark up loan. This made his life tougher, the grocery store was closed and to make both ends meet he joined the school as teacher. Earnings were enough for daily needs, but to repay the loan he started working in the paper mill after school hours. In winter season working while standing in cold water was very hard, but he patiently endured this. During this time he had two sons. After six years of hardships when he got Relief his younger son, Muhammad Sharif, and wife died. Due to these hardships he tired of worldly life. His cousin,Syed Jamal ud Din, asked him to find a spiritual mentor who could help in worldly affairs. Khawaja Shahudin took the position that he is interested in the world hereafter and want someone who could lead him in the path of Allah. After a long conversation with his cousin suggested the name of Syed Asghar Ali Shah and assured that he is a reliable spiritual mentor. On the next Friday before noon both went to Syed Asgar Ali and his cousin briefly told about the whereabouts of K Khawaja Shahudin. After listening he said "With the will of Allah this will discover his inner self" and took him in his bayat.

Post Bay'at Life
Khawaja Shahudin's life changed rapidly after pledging spiritual allegiance from Syed Asgar Ali. Apparently it was growing dark, but in reality his heart was illuminated with the love of Allah. He set aside from everything other than Allah. In this period the love of Allah created unrest and there was no peace for him, neither in populace nor in the jungle. Only urge in his life was to get the objective of life that is recognition of Allah. The only place of tranquility was the palace of Syed Asgar Ali. As soon as he left the court of his Murshad (Spiritual Mentor) the same unrest surrounded him. This state persisted for a number of years, then one day when he was sitting on roadside while returning from the court of his Murshad he heard the vociferation. He lifted his eyes and saw intoxicated dervish Baba Lahori Shah standing beside. He revealed that the trial is over and a number of people will be benefited from you and left. Shahudin felt amused and dried his eyes. This revelation did not lessen the desire to meet the beloved.

After a few days of this revelation from Baba Lahori one day at the third quarter of the night when he was indulged in invocation he found his heart illumined with divine light. And in accordance with the Hadith (قلوب المومنین عرش اللہ تعالی)'The heart of a Momin is the throne of Allah' Allah manifested himself in his heart. This changed the tears of worries into happiness and he went straight to his Murshad who embraced him and cherished with further divine gifts. After this event life became normal and period of excited state was over. When life became normal he started serving his Murshad while staying at his place with sincere intention. Peer Asgar Ali Shah showed great affection for him and his presence was necessary in all the events and gave him the alias Shah-e-Din. Once due to illness Shahudin could not participate in the event of urs (Annual religious ceremony). When the food was ready and one of the dervish asked for permission to start the ceremony he asked about Shah-e-din (Bhai) and dervish told that he could not come due to illness. Syed Asgar Ali said without the Bhai ceremony will not begin and sent a messenger to bring the Bhai at the place.

In leisure time Bhai used to read from the translated books of Aulia Ikram (Friends of Allah) in the presence of Syed Asgar Ali. He enjoyed listening from the books and elaborated the difficult points for the guidance of listeners.

One day his Murshad asked him to get married and emphasised that it's his will. Within a few days everything was arranged intuitively and Bhai was married. Similarly, one day his Mashhad, said Bhai it would be better to start some work or find a job. On his way home Bhai came across a leather trader who was looking for an honest accountant. He requested Bhai to take over the position and offered a competitive salary. Bhai accepted the position on the condition that he will not be bound to stay at office after completion of work and will avail leave on Friday. He did this job for 27 years in a best possible way and in the free time translated the poetic work of Persian poets in Punjabi language and the Malik Chanan published all the books.

Work
During his lifetime, Shahudin produced three poetry books, and fifteen poetic translations of Arabic and Persian works into Punjabi.

Bibliography

Poetry
Salat Ul Aarfeen
Noha-e-Ushaaq
Maulood Sharif

Poetic translations
Shahudin produced translations of the following:
Ali
Abdul Qadir Jilani
Sultan Bahu
Bu Ali Shah Qalandar
Moinuddin Chishti
Mahmud Shabistari
Hafez Sherazi
Masnavi Maulana Rumi
Masnavi Bu Ali Shah Qalandar
Masnavi Shams Tabrizi
Manajat Siddiq-e-Akbar (Abu Bakr)
Manajat Ali
Manajat Khawaja Naqashband
Masnavi Farid U Din Attar (Attar of Nishapur)
Qaseeda Israr-e-Haq Ghulam Muhammad Siddiqui Qadri Lahori

Miracles and manifestations
A person told Mumtaz Ali Qadri that he came across a person in the village festival who was sitting sad. When inquired he said that he belongs to a wealthy family from Lahore. In childhood he met Sher Muhammad Sharaqpuri who gave him favour and in fascination showed him inexplicable things even showed him Muhammad and his family and other Prophets. After this event he attracted towards him and decided to get spiritual allegiance from him, but due to some work he left for Lahore. Then after two days he read in a newspaper that Sharaqpuri has died. After that he remained sad and senseless. When he became normal he set out to find someone with illumined heart. One of his friends in Sialkot was aware of his illness. He took him to a spiritual mentor. When they went there to meet him, he was talking to some people and alluded them to sit down. When he was sitting in the session, he went into the same state that he observed while sitting in the congregation of Sher Muhammad Sharaqpuri. And he saw everything again and became happy. After this he went home and made up his mind to get Bayat from this person. When he arrived home, he learned of his sister's death. So he left to attend her funeral. When he returned to Sialkot, he learned that this person had also died. This was the second time that he missed the chance to live in the congregation of illumined heart. On asking him, he said that this second person was Khawaja Shahudin from Pakka Ghara Sialkot.

References

Pakistani poets
People from Sialkot District
1867 births
1948 deaths
Pakistani Sufis